Grzymki  is a village in the administrative district of Gmina Przytuły, within Łomża County, Podlaskie Voivodeship, in north-eastern Poland.

It was the birthplace (1807) of Wincenty Gostkowski who later in life emigrated to Switzerland and became prominent in watchmaking.

References

Grzymki